Joseph Zito (born May 14, 1946) is an American film director and producer, best known for directing several cult and genre films throughout the 1980s, such as Missing in Action, Invasion U.S.A., Red Scorpion, The Prowler, and Friday the 13th: The Final Chapter. In 1985–1986, Zito spent a year of pre-production on the Cannon version of Spider-Man which eventually fell through. Zito left the production due to budgetary constraints.

Filmography

Film

Television

Other

References

External links
 

Living people
Film directors from New York City
1946 births
Action film directors
Horror film directors